Martin van Duren known as Mart (born 27 October 1964) is a retired Dutch football striker.

Van Duren played his youth football in the youth department by PSV Eindhoven. In 1982 he advanced from their U-19 team to their first team. Two years later her transferred to Racing Jet de Bruxelles, where he played for two seasons, but because the team were relegated, he then moved on to BVV Den Bosch, where he played for five seasons. Van Duren then moved to FC Groningen, he played four seasons with them.

Van Duren joined FC Basel's first team for their 1994–95 season under head coach Claude Andrey. After playing in one test game against the clubs own U-21 team, in which he scored a goal, as the professionals won 5–0, van Duren played his domestic league debut for his new club in the away game in the Cornaredo on 2 October 1994 as Basel played against Lugano. He scored his first goal for the club in the same game as they played a 1–1 draw.

At the end of the season van Duren retired from his active football career. During his time with Basel, van Duren played a total of 12 games for the team scoring two goals. Six of these games were in the Nationalliga A and six were friendly games. He scored one goal in the domestic league and the other was scored in the afore mentioned test game.

References

Sources
 Rotblau: Jahrbuch Saison 2017/2018. Publisher: FC Basel Marketing AG. 
 Die ersten 125 Jahre. Publisher: Josef Zindel im Friedrich Reinhardt Verlag, Basel. 
 Verein "Basler Fussballarchiv" Homepage

1964 births
Living people
Dutch footballers
PSV Eindhoven players
Racing Jet Wavre players
FC Den Bosch players
FC Groningen players
FC Basel players
Association football forwards
Eredivisie players
Swiss Super League players
Dutch expatriate footballers
Expatriate footballers in Belgium
Dutch expatriate sportspeople in Belgium
Expatriate footballers in Switzerland
Dutch expatriate sportspeople in Switzerland
PSV Eindhoven non-playing staff